Ranjit can refer to:

 Ranjit Singh (disambiguation)
Ranjit Singh (1780–1839), First Maharaja of the Sikh Empire
Ranjit Singh of Bharatpur (1776–1805), ruler of the Bharatpur princely state in Rajasthan, India
K. S. Ranjitsinhji (1872–1933), cricketer and Maharaja Jam Sahib of Nawanagar
Ranjit Singh Dyal (1928–2012), Indian Army officer and administrator
Ranjit Singh Boparan, British Businessman
Ranjit Singh Gujjar (born 1984), Indian sportsperson
Ranjit Chowdhry, actor
Ranjit Mallick, Bengali film actor
Ranjit Hoskote, Indian poet
Ranjit Shekhar Mooshahary, Governor of Meghalaya, a state in India
Ranjit Studios, former film company
Ranjit Desai, Marathi writer
Ranjit Bolt, British playwright and translator
Ranjit Fernando, Sri Lankan cricketer
Ranjit Naik, architect and social worker
Ranjit Bhatia, Indian athlete
Ranjit Debbarma, current chairman of the All Tripura Tiger Force
Ranjit Kamble, Maharashtra minister
Marshall Manesh, actor who played Ranjit on How I Met Your Mother

See also 

Ranjith